The Shinwa-kai (親和会 "Brotherhood Association") in the Sumiyoshi-ikka, is a yakuza gang based in Tochigi-shi, Tochigi, Japan. It is affiliated with the Sumiyoshi-kai, Japan's second-largest yakuza syndicate.

Yakuza groups